Love Is Blind is the third solo album by the English singer Limahl, released in 1992 (on Bellaphon Records in Germany, and on Jimco Records in Japan, the only two countries where the record was ever marketed). The work was also released in other two German-speaking countries of central Europe, namely Austria and Switzerland.

Music
The album mainly contains pop and dance-oriented tunes, and it is entirely produced by Limahl himself, with the help of a number of co-producers, including the Academy Award-winning English orchestra composer and pop musician Anne Dudley, and writer/producer Graham Stack, who has written and produced hit records for many artists including Kylie Minogue, Tina Turner, Take That, Rod Stewart and Steps, though Limahl's own record wasn't particularly successful at the time. In fact, none of the singles or the album itself ever entered the charts in any of the few countries of release.

Editions
The 12-track Japanese edition also includes two bonus tracks, which are not featured on the 10-track German edition, these being "Stop (Long Dub Version)" and "Maybe This Time (Dub Version)", the original versions of which were both taken as singles to promote the album. Strangely enough, both of these singles were released under the semi-fictitious pseudonym "Bassline featuring Limahl", behind which lies the artist himself, appearing as "LUC", standing for "Limahl Under Cover".

Singles
The album produces two more singles, i.e. the title track, "Love Is Blind", and a new remix, with a more modern sound, of "Too Shy", which, back in 1983, was originally a UK Number One for Kajagoogoo, the band Limahl was the lead singer of for a short while, in the first half of 1983, again in 2003–2004 for VH1 Bands Reunited series, and finally once again since 2008. With them, the singer is currently recording a new studio album and, at the same time, touring Europe: after debuting in Denmark and performing in Scotland, during two rock festivals in Summer, the tour will move to Germany, in November, and then to England, in December 2008.

Release
In Germany alone, where either Kajagoogoo and Limahl's popularity, though a 25-year-long separation as a five-piece band, and almost as long an inactivity in general, was always maintained, Limahl's third solo work was first released in October 1992, and re-released in 1998. Unlike his first two long playing works, 1984 Don't Suppose and 1986 Colour All My Days, only out as vinyl LPs and as MCs, and never so far digitally re-released in their entirety, Limahl's third album was released exclusively as a CD, without being marketed anyway neither in the UK nor in any other countries outside Japan and central Europe, though fans' requests.

Track listing

 "Love Is Blind" (Limahl) – 3:51
 "So Far So Good" (Limahl, Eric V. Tijn, Jochem Fluitsma) – 3:58
 "Stop" (Limahl, Steve Pigott) – 4:00
 "Too Shy '92" (Limahl, Nick Beggs, Jez Strode, Steve Askew, Stuart Croxford Neale) – 4:03
 "Let's Get Together Again" (Limahl, Anne Dudley) – 4:10
 "Life Must Go On" (Limahl, Shaun Imrei, Graham Stack) – 4:18
 "Maybe This Time" (Limahl, Steve Pigott) – 4:24
 "Cheatin" (Limahl, Colin Taffe) – 3:45
 "Stay with Me" (Limahl, Peter Oxendale) – 5:06
 "Someone Else" (Limahl) – 4:26
 "Stop" (Long Dub Version) (Limahl, Steve Piggott) – 4:53 
 "Maybe This Time" (Dub Version) (Limahl, Steve Piggott) – 3:58 [bonus track in Japan only]

Singles released
1992 – "Stop (7" Version)"/"Stop (Instrumental)" [released as "Bassline featuring Limahl"]
1992 – "Maybe This Time (7" Mix)"/"Maybe This Time (a cappella Version)" [released as "Bassline featuring Limahl"]
1992 – "Too Shy '92 (Radio edit)"/"Too Shy '92 (a cappella Version)"
1992 – "Love Is Blind (Album Version)"/"Love Is Blind (a cappella Version)"

Personnel
Limahl - lead singer, production
Eric V. Tijn, Jochem Fluitsma - co-production #3
Steve Pigott - co-production #4, #7, #11, #12
Andy Reynolds - co-production #4, #11
Anne Dudley - co-production No. 5
Shaun Imrei, Graham Stack - co-production No. 6
Colin Taffe - co-production #8
Peter Oxendale - co-production #9
Brian Aris - cover photography

Release details

External links
 Love is Blind album
 Limahl Official British Website (in English)
 KajaFax - The Officially Approved Limahl & Kajagoogoo Community & Fan Club
 Unofficial Limahl & Kajagoogoo YouTube video archives

1992 albums
Limahl albums
Bellaphon Records albums